American country music duo Maddie & Tae have released two studio albums, five extended plays, seven singles, seven promotional singles, twelve music videos and appeared on two albums. Signing with Dot Records, the label released their debut single in 2014 titled "Girl in a Country Song." The song reached number one on the Billboard Country Airplay chart their self-titled EP was released the same year. In 2015, their debut studio album was released titled Start Here. It spent 40 weeks on the Billboard Top Country Albums and climbed to number two. The album also entered the top ten of the Billboard 200 list. Also in 2015, their single, "Fly" reached the top ten of country charts and was also included on their debut album.

In 2017, Dot Records closed its doors, prompting Maddie & Tae to switch to Mercury Records in 2018. The same year, they released the single, "Friends Don't." The song reached the top 40 of the Billboard country chart by early 2019. Their next release was 2019 EP titled One Heart to Another. It was followed by the single, "Die from a Broken Heart." By summer 2020, the song topped the Billboard country songs list, their first major hit since 2015. The hit was included on the duo's second album, The Way It Feels, which was also released in 2020.

Studio albums

Extended plays

Singles

As lead artist

Promotional singles

Music videos

Other album appearances

Notes

References

External links
 Maddie & Tae releases at Discogs

Discographies of American artists
Country music discographies